Trihydroxypterocarpan dimethylallyltransferase (glyceollin synthase, dimethylallylpyrophosphate:3,6a,9-trihydroxypterocarpan dimethylallyltransferase, dimethylallylpyrophosphate:trihydroxypterocarpan dimethylallyl transferase, dimethylallyl-diphosphate:(6aS,11aS)-3,6a,9-trihydroxypterocarpan dimethyltransferase) is an enzyme with systematic name dimethylallyl-diphosphate:(6aS,11aS)-3,6a,9-trihydroxypterocarpan  dimethylallyltransferase. This enzyme catalyses the following chemical reaction

 (1) dimethylallyl diphosphate + (6aS,11aS)-3,6a,9-trihydroxypterocarpan  diphosphate + 2-dimethylallyl-(6aS,11aS)-3,6a,9-trihydroxypterocarpan
 (2) dimethylallyl diphosphate + (6aS,11aS)-3,6a,9-trihydroxypterocarpan  diphosphate + 4-dimethylallyl-(6aS,11aS)-3,6a,9-trihydroxypterocarpan

Part of the glyceollin biosynthesis system in soy bean.

References

External links 

EC 2.5.1